Donna Hobin (born 10 April 1956) is a Canadian basketball player. She competed in the women's tournament at the 1976 Summer Olympics.

References

External links
 

1956 births
Living people
Canadian women's basketball players
Olympic basketball players of Canada
Basketball players at the 1976 Summer Olympics
Basketball players from Ottawa